Ponmudy may refer to:

 K. Ponmudy (born 1950), minister for higher education in Tamil Nadu
 Ponmudy (film), a 1982 Indian Malayalam film